1998–99 Országos Bajnokság I (men's water polo) was the 93rd water polo championship in Hungary.

First stage 

Pld - Played; W - Won; L - Lost; PF - Points for; PA - Points against; Diff - Difference; Pts - Points.

Championship Playoff

Final standing

Play-off 
Tabán Trafik-Szegedi VE – OSC 10–6, 3–7, 9–8, 4–6, 10–3

ELTE-BEAC-Intruder – Tabán Trafik-Szegedi VE 10–5, 8–4, 9–8

Sources 
Gyarmati Dezső: Aranykor (Hérodotosz Könyvkiadó és Értékesítő Bt., Budapest, 2002.)

Seasons in Hungarian water polo competitions
Hungary
1998 in water polo
1998 in Hungarian sport
1999 in water polo
1999 in Hungarian sport